The 2022 CONCACAF Women's U-20 Championship was the 11th edition of the CONCACAF Women's U-20 Championship, the biennial international youth football championship organised by CONCACAF for the women's under-20 national teams of the North, Central American and Caribbean region. Same as previous edition, the tournament will featured 20 teams and was held in the Dominican Republic, between 25 February and 12 March 2022.

The top three teams of the tournament qualified for the 2022 FIFA U-20 Women's World Cup and joined host nation Costa Rica as the CONCACAF representatives.

Qualification

The 41 CONCACAF teams were ranked based on the CONCACAF Women's Under-20 Ranking as of 31 March 2020, and 28 entered the competition for the 2022 CONCACAF Women's U-20 Championship final tournament. The highest-ranked 16 entrants advanced directly to the group stage of the final tournament, while the other 12 entrants participated in qualifying. The four group winners in qualifying advance directly into the knockout stage of the final tournament.

Costa Rica will host the 2022 FIFA U-20 Women's World Cup and, therefore, is exempt from participating in the tournament. Saint Kitts and Nevis, the 17th best ranked CONCACAF Women's Under-20, will take their place in the group stage and, therefore, were exempt from participating in the 2022 CONCACAF Women's U-20 Championship Qualifiers.

Venues

Draw
The draw of the tournament was held on 15 November 2021, 11:00 AST (UTC−4), at the CONCACAF Headquarters in Miami, Florida. The 16 teams which entered the group stage were drawn into four groups of four teams. Based on the CONCACAF Women's Under-20 Ranking, the 16 teams were distributed into four pots, with teams in Pot 1 assigned to each group prior to the draw, as follows:

Squads

Players born on or after 1 January 2002 are eligible to compete. Each team must register a squad of 20 players, two of whom must be goalkeepers.

Match officials
CONCACAF announced the appointment of the match officials on February 11, 2022.

Referees

 Carly Shaw-MacLaren
 Marianela Araya Cruz
 Astrid Gramajo
 Melissa Borjas
 Odette Hamilton
 Katia García
 Francia González
 Diana Pérez
 Priscilla Pérez
 Tatiana Guzmán
 Sandra Benítez
 Mirian León
 Crystal Sobers
 Ekaterina Koroleva
 Tori Penso
 Natalie Simon

Assistants referees

 Krystal Evans
 Natasha Trott
 Chantal Boudreau
 Ivette Santiago Rodríguez
 Santa Medina
 Iris Vail 
 Lourdes Noriega
 Shirley Perelló
 Princess Brown
 Jassett Kerr
 Stephanie-Dale Yee Sing
 Yudilia Briones
 Enedina Caudillo
 Karen Díaz
 Mayra Mora
 Sandra Ramírez
 Lidia Ayala
 Mijensa Rensch
 Carissa Douglas-Jacobs
 Felisha Marsical
 Brooke Mayo
 Meghan Mullen
 Kathryn Nesbitt

Video assistant referees

 Benjamin Whitty
 Ricardo Montero
 Bejamín Pineda 
 Said Martínez
 Adonai Escobedo
 Eduardo Galván
 Ismael Cornejo
 Allen Chapman
 Tim Ford

Group stage
The top three teams in each group advance to the round of 16, where they are joined by the four teams advancing from the 2022 CONCACAF Women's U-20 Championship Qualifiers.

Tiebreakers
The ranking of teams in each group is determined as follows (Regulations Article 12.8):
Points obtained in all group matches (three points for a win, one for a draw, zero for a loss).
Goal difference in all group matches.
Number of goals scored in all group matches.
Points obtained in the matches played between the teams in question.
Goal difference in the matches played between the teams in question.
Number of goals scored in the matches played between the teams in question.
Fair play points in all group matches (only one deduction can be applied to a player in a single match):
Yellow card: −1 point
Indirect red card (second yellow card): −3 points
Direct red card: −4 points
Yellow card and direct red card: −5 points
Drawing of lots.

All times are local, AST (UTC−4).

Group E

Group F

Group G

Group H

Knockout stage
In the knockout stage, if a match is level at the end of 90 minutes, extra time is played, and if still tied after extra time, the match is decided by a penalty shoot-out (Regulations Article 12.13).

Bracket

Round of 16

Quarter-finals

Semi-finals
Winners qualified for the 2022 FIFA U-20 Women's World Cup.

3rd Place
Winner qualified for 2022 FIFA U-20 Women's World Cup.

Final

Winners

Goalscorers

Qualified teams for FIFA U-20 Women's World Cup

1 Bold indicates champions for that year. Italic indicates hosts for that year.
2 (H) qualified as host of 2022 FIFA U-20 Women's World Cup.

Awards

References

External links
Concacaf Women's Under-20 Championship, CONCACAF.com

2022 CONCACAF Women's U-20 Championship
CONCACAF Women's U-20 Championship
Concacaf
2022 in youth association football
2022 FIFA U-20 Women's World Cup qualification
International association football competitions hosted by the Dominican Republic
CONCACAF
CONCACAF